Hugh Dixon (born 26 February 1999) is an Australian rules footballer who played for the West Coast Eagles in the Australian Football League (AFL), having previously played for the Fremantle Football Club.

Early career

Drafted with the 44th selection in the 2017 AFL draft from the Kingborough Football Club in the Tasmanian State League, he played most of the junior football as a key forward and part-time ruckman. After playing for the Allies at the 2017 AFL Under 18 Championships, he was the only player from Tasmania to be invited to the 2017 AFL Draft Combine.

AFL career

Upon moving to Fremantle, he played for Peel Thunder in the West Australian Football League (WAFL), Fremantle's reserve team, however ankle and hamstring injuries restricted him to only 9 games in 2018 and 13 games in 2019.

Dixon made his AFL debut for Fremantle in the last round of the 2019 AFL season at Adelaide Oval against Port Adelaide, as a late replacement for Sean Darcy who withdrew due to delayed concussion.

At the end of the 2020 AFL season he was delisted by the Fremantle Dockers without playing any more AFL games. He then joined the East Fremantle Football Club in the West Australian Football League for the 2021 season.

Dixon was re-drafted as a rookie by  ahead of the 2022 AFL season as part of the supplemental selection period (SSP).

References

External links

WAFL Player Profile and Statistics

1999 births
Living people
Fremantle Football Club players
Peel Thunder Football Club players
Australian rules footballers from Tasmania
Kingborough Football Club players
East Fremantle Football Club players
West Coast Eagles players